Rotherham Central railway station is in Rotherham, South Yorkshire, England. The station was originally named "Rotherham", becoming "Rotherham and Masborough" in January 1889 and finally "Rotherham Central" on 25 September 1950.
 

History

The first, a single platform terminus was built on what became the coal yard by the South Yorkshire Railway (SYR). Today this approximates to the land off Brinsworth Street below the bridge which carries the Inner Relief Road over the railway. The SYR could not gain permission to pass below the already built line of the Sheffield and Rotherham Railway, opened in 1838. A few years later and following amalgamation into the Manchester, Sheffield and Lincolnshire Railway (MS&LR), a scheme was developed to fill the South Yorkshire Navigation, a canal already owned by that railway company and divert its course into the nearby River Don. As the Navigation already passed below the Sheffield and Rotherham line this would solve the problem, although until recent years the line was prone to flooding. The SYR already had a single line from Mexborough, on its Barnsley to Doncaster line, towards Rotherham, running alongside the canal but only as far as the pottery and brickworks at Kilnhurst, leaving a gap of almost  between. When the through line was completed a new, although temporary Rotherham station was built in the cut with access from the road above named "Amen Corner". This served the town from 1 August 1868. The line between Rotherham and Mexborough opened for goods traffic on 13 March 1871; passenger services began on 3 April 1871 but these continued to use the temporary station until the permanent Rotherham Central station was opened on 1 February 1874. This was an elongated affair with staggered platforms and a large stone main building adjacent to the "Statutes Fair Ground" (now the site of Rotherham's main police station). Originally the access was from Main Street, at the Sheffield end, and College Road, at the Doncaster end. In January 1889 this station was renamed Rotherham and Masborough. This station came under the ownership of the Great Central Railway (GCR) when the MS&LR changed its name in anticipation of its extension to London (Marylebone station), in 1897. The station was served by Sheffield Victoria -  local trains and others ranging from the north east to the south coast, the Great Central Railway being involved in many operations jointly with other companies. The GCR amalgamated with other railways to form the London and North Eastern Railway (LNER) at the start of 1923; the LNER was itself nationalised at the start of 1948, becoming part of the newly formed British Railways (BR). Following this, Rotherham and Masborough was renamed Rotherham Central on 25 September 1950. Its last main line train, a throw-back to pre-First World War One joint operations, being the Newcastle to Bournemouth express. This station was closed on 5 September 1966 and soon demolished.

With the rationalisation of railways in the area in full swing plans to concentrate Sheffield's train services at Sheffield Midland station led to the building of a major new junction between the lines of the former Great Central and the Midland Railway at Aldwarke Junction north of Rotherham, allowing Sheffield - Doncaster trains to be routed onto the Midland line to Sheffield Midland station via Rotherham Masborough. With only one station in town, eventually, "Masborough" was dropped from the name of the remaining station.
Rotherham Masborough was located almost half-a-mile away from Rotherham town centre and by the 1980s this was judged to be hindering the use of train services from the town.

Present station 
In order to provide a more convenient service, a single line link was constructed from the Midland Line at Holmes Junction, on the Sheffield side of Masborough station, to pass below the Midland line and join the Great Central south of the planned new station. This was known as "The Holmes Chord".

The first sod of earth on the site of the new station was ceremonially cut by the Mayor of Rotherham, Councillor J. L. Skelton on Tuesday, 8 July 1986. He also unveiled a plaque to commemorate the event. On Wednesday, 8 April 1987 the Chairman of the South Yorkshire Passenger Transport Authority, Councillor Jack Meredith ceremonially fixed the last rail clip. The new Rotherham Central station was opened to passengers on 11 May 1987, is situated by the College Road bridge, near the town centre, the Doncaster-bound platform on the site of the 1871 platform but the Sheffield - bound platform is now opposite. The station buildings, of modern brick construction are at road level, with the entrance way through the ticket office; the platforms are approached by ramps. The whole scheme, the station and the Holmes Chord, cost £2,400,000, the P.T.E. funding the scheme with a contribution from Rotherham Metropolitan Borough Council to enhance platform shelter facilities. A grant for half the cost was obtained from the European Regional Development Fund. After just six months, the passenger usage was recorded as being up by 120% compared with the old Masborough station for the same period of 1986.

The official opening date was set for 2 June, however this was postponed due to expected picketing by members of the National Union of Railwaymen demonstrating against the cutting of 11 jobs with the transfer of staff from Masborough and the concerns over the staff reduction on the platform at the new station, this being reduced to one person.

Rotherham Masborough remained for the three per day Sheffield-York trains having regained its suffix, until its closure in 1988, when all services were concentrated on Central station. Clearly, this time the will for rationalising station names had vanished, because the sole remaining Rotherham station still retains its suffix "Central".

Redevelopment
It was announced by Northern that in 2010 the station would undergo a £8.5 million refurbishment, as part of the "Rotherham Renaissance" plans for the regeneration of the town. The 1980s station buildings and ramps would be replaced by a new travel centre, along with new platform canopies, lifts and CCTV. As part of this the car park would also be redesigned. A temporary station entrance would be constructed for passenger use while the buildings were replaced. 
Work on the project commenced on Monday, 22 February 2010 with a temporary station entrance being constructed, expected to come into operation during March. The temporary station opened on Friday 9 July and the old travel centre demolished a month later. After being dogged by delays, the new station buildings and platforms opened for public use on Friday 24 February 2012.

Tram Train 
Rotherham Central Station is now served by the Sheffield Supertram Tram-Train, with services running up to 3 times per hour between Rotherham Parkgate (Retail World shopping centre) and Sheffield Cathedral stops. The service opened on 25 October 2018, and calls at its own low-level platforms to the south of the National Rail platforms, however they are directly connected to one another by a ramp.

Services
Three trains per day operate to York via the Dearne Valley Line. There are also two tram-trains an hour towards Rotherham Parkgate and towards Sheffield Cathedral.

On Sundays, the station is served by an hourly service to Doncaster, a train every two hours to Leeds, two trains per day to York and either one or two trains per hour to Sheffield.

TransPennine Express operates a very limited service from the station. There are no eastbound or evening services which call at the station.

The line through Rotherham Masborough railway station survives, and is used by fast passenger services between Sheffield and Leeds/York to bypass Rotherham Central station. Freight services using the "Old Road", the original North Midland Railway line to reach Chesterfield, avoiding Sheffield also traverse this route.

The 2019 United Kingdom floods caused severe disruption to train and tram-train services running through the station, as the station and lines in the area were flooded. The tram-train service, and the Sheffield to Leeds (via Moorthorpe) route were both suspended.

References

External links

Railway stations in Rotherham
DfT Category E stations
Former Great Central Railway stations
Railway stations in Great Britain opened in 1868
Railway stations in Great Britain closed in 1966
Railway stations in Great Britain opened in 1987
Northern franchise railway stations
Reopened railway stations in Great Britain
Buildings and structures in Rotherham
Railway stations served by TransPennine Express
Sheffield Supertram stops